Temminck's striped mouse or West African hybomys (Hybomys trivirgatus) is a species of rodent in the family Muridae.
It is found in Ivory Coast, Ghana, Guinea, Liberia, Nigeria, and Sierra Leone.
Its natural habitat is subtropical or tropical moist lowland forest.
It is threatened by habitat loss.

References

 Van der Straeten, E. & Decher, J. 2004.  Hybomys trivirgatus.   2006 IUCN Red List of Threatened Species.   Downloaded on 19 July 2007.

Hybomys
Rodents of Africa
Mammals described in 1853
Taxonomy articles created by Polbot